Parosca is a genus of flies in the family Tabanidae.

Species
Parosca latipalpis (Macquart, 1850)
Parosca subulipalpis (Enderlein, 1929)
Parosca viridiventris (Macquart, 1838)

References

Tabanidae
Brachycera genera
Diptera of South America
Taxa named by Günther Enderlein